The Palace of Justice of Brussels or Law Courts of Brussels is a courthouse in Brussels, Belgium. It is the country's most important court building, seat of the judicial arrondissement of Brussels, as well as of several courts and tribunals, including the Court of Cassation (Belgian supreme court), the Court of Assizes (highest criminal court), the Court of Appeal of Brussels (appellate court), the Tribunal of First Instance of Brussels (general jurisdiction), and the Bar Association of Brussels.

Designed by the architect Joseph Poelaert, in an eclectic style of Greco-Roman inspiration, to replace an older courthouse, the current building was erected between 1866 and 1883. The total cost of the construction, land, and furnishings approximated 50 million Belgian francs. The building suffered heavy damage during World War II, when the cupola was destroyed and later rebuilt higher than the original. The structure has been under renovation since 1984 and scaffolding from that era still hangs on the building, though it is set to come down in 2024.

The Palace of Justice is located on the / in the Marolles/Marollen district (southern part of Brussels' city centre). A notable landmark of Brussels, this site is served by Louise/Louiza metro station (on lines 2 and 6 of the Brussels Metro), as well as the homonymous tram stop (on lines 8 and 92). From the lower part of town, it is also possible to take public elevators, called the Poelaert Elevators, to access it.

History

First courthouse (1818–1892)
The current Palace of Justice is located on the Galgenberg hill ("Gallows Mount"), between Brussels' upper and lower town, where in the Middle Ages convicted criminals were hanged, hence its name. A first courthouse had been erected, at a different location, in the Sablon/Zavel district, on the / (today's /), between the / (today's /) and the (now-disappeared) /.

Built between 1818 and 1823 by the French architect  on the site of a former Jesuit church, this first neoclassical structure had quickly deteriorated, and the question of building a new and larger courthouse arose as early as 1837. The condition was that the building could accommodate all civil and military jurisdictions under one roof. The choice of location, however, gave rise to heated controversies. It was indeed initially planned to rebuild it in the same place, but this project, the cost of which was estimated at 3 million Belgian francs,quickly aborted. The idea of building it in the newly developed Leopold Quarter in the eastern part of town was no more successful. In 1846–47, another reconstruction project was also buried.

Inception of the project (1858–1866)
In 1858, the then-Minister of Justice, Victor Tesch, suggested for the first time the gardens of the House of Merode, where the extension of the / would be constructed. The governor of the Province of Brabant suggested that it would be possible at the same time to link the new Louise/Louiza district to the city centre. Following a proposal from the advisor to the Court of Appeal, aiming at installing the building perpendicular to the Rue de la Régence rather than to the right of this extension, a study was entrusted to the Chief Engineer Groetaers. Disagreements having arisen between Groetaers and the city's mayor, the latter called for a competition for the building's design.

On 27 March 1860, an international architectural competition, endowed with three prizes, was therefore organised by royal decree. After several failed proposals, Tesch appointed the city's municipal architect, Joseph Poelaert, to draw plans of the building in 1861. The architect already enjoyed an excellent reputation, having to his credit a series of very prestigious projects in the capital, such as the commemorative Congress Column (1850), the Church of St. Catherine (1854) and the restoration of the Royal Theatre of La Monnaie (1855).

In April 1862, Poelaert submitted a preliminary draft, which was approved by Tesch. It was then in Paris, far from the pressures and influences of Brussels, that Poelaert withdrew to put the final touches to his plans. There, he gathered a team of designers including  and Édouard Corroyer. Given the prominent place that the Palace of Justice was called upon to occupy in the urban landscape, Poelaert opted for an eclectic style of Greco-Roman inspiration. Although he was inspired by classicism, he created a totally personal and original work.

Construction (1866–1883)
The first stone was laid on 31 October 1866. At Poelaert's request, the management of the works was entrusted to the engineer , Inspector General of the Ministry of Public Works and President of the Royal Commission of Monuments between 1865 and 1897. After Poelaert's death on 3 November 1879, the construction was taken over by the architect Joseph Joachim Benoît. The building was inaugurated on 15 October 1883 by King Leopold II in the presence of his wife Queen Marie-Henriette, his daughter Princess Clémentine, and members of the Belgian Royal Family. As for the old courthouse, it was demolished in 1892 for the construction of the /, which leads into the Place de la Justice.

For the Palace of Justice's construction, a section of the Marolles/Marollen neighbourhood was demolished, while most of the garden belonging to the House of Merode was also expropriated. The 75 landlords belonging to the nobility and the high bourgeoisie, many of whom lived in their homes, received large indemnities, while the other more modest inhabitants, about a hundred, were also forced to move by the Belgian Government, though they were compensated with houses in the Tillens-Roosendael garden city in the Quartier du Chat in the Uccle municipality.

Poelaert himself resided in the Marolles, only a few hundred metres from the building, on the /, in a house adjoining his vast offices and workshops and communicating with them. It is thus unlikely he saw himself as ruining the neighbourhood. Nonetheless, many angry citizens personally blamed Poelaert for the forced relocations, and the expression schieven architect (meaning "shameful architect") became one of the most serious insults in the dialect of the Marolles. Although the construction took place during the reign of Leopold II, the king showed little interest in the building, and it is not considered part of his extensive architectural programme in Brussels nor his legacy as the "Builder-King".

Damage and renovation (1945–present)

At the end of the Second World War, on the eve of the liberation of Brussels, the retreating German forces started a fire in the Palace of Justice in order to destroy it, as well as the legal records it contained. As a result, the cupola collapsed and part of the building was heavily damaged. The explosion of a V-1 rocket in the Rue des Minimes two months later caused additional damage. In 1947, the restoration work was entrusted to the architect-engineer and custodian of the Palace, . By 1948, most of the building was repaired, and the cupola was rebuilt  higher than the original, whose somewhat flat shape had previously been criticised.

Renovations on the building have been in progress since 1984. These renovations pertain to the repair and strengthening of the roof structure and the walls, as well as putting a new layer on the gilded cupola. In 2002–03, the roofing was renewed and the structural structure was repaired and reinforced. On 1 September 2003, the protective foil was removed from the dome, thus becoming once again an eye-catcher in the skyline of Brussels. Progress is slow, however, and in 2013, it was reported that the decade-old scaffolding was so rusted and unsafe that the scaffolding itself was in need of renovation.

Since the end of the 20th century, many jurisdictions have successively left the Palace of Justice on the grounds that it no longer meets the criteria required for the exercise of contemporary justice, particularly in terms of the required workspace. The Government of the Brussels-Capital Region ended up issuing two designations orders, on 3 May 2001 and on 28 February 2008, "Because of its historical, artistic and technical interest". In 2008, a proposal was made for the building's recognition as a World Heritage Site by UNESCO. In 2016, the World Monuments Fund placed the courthouse on its list of endangered monuments. In 2018, following the collapse of part of the ceiling, Jean de Codt , first president of the Court of Cassation and highest magistrate in the country, spoke openly in the media to demand additional financial resources to ensure the building's sustainability and the safety of those who work there. Several plans have followed to find solutions to the dilapidated rooms and to security problems, but the work is expected to last for many more years, leaving the building's future uncertain. As of 2022, additional renovation plans have been announced, with completion expected now for "2024 or 2025".

Dimensions
Brussels' Palace of Justice was, at the time of its construction, the largest building in the world, and remains today one of the largest courthouses. The  dome weighs .

The building includes huge interior statues of Demosthenes and Lycurgus by the sculptor , and figures of the Roman jurists Cicero and Ulpian by Antoine-Félix Bouré. A compass rose with sixteen rays marks the centre of the room.

Many questions remain on this project which saw its budget exceed 50 million Belgian francs (which was equivalent to an entire year of public works in the country at the time) for an initial estimate of barely 4 million. The excessiveness of the site, and the freedom left to the architect to override almost all the rules initially imposed, remain a great mystery.

Usage

The Palace of Justice is the most important court building in Belgium, seat of the country's different courts and tribunals, most notably the Court of Cassation, its supreme court. The Court of Cassation handles cases in the two main languages of Belgium, being Dutch and French, and provides certain facilities for cases in German. The Court of Assizes (criminal court which tries the most serious crimes), the Court of Appeal of Brussels (appellate court), as well as the Tribunal of First Instance of Brussels (general jurisdiction), also seat there. The Palace of Justice also includes within it the prosecution services adjoining these jurisdictions, as well as various libraries.

Courts and tribunals
 Court of Cassation: 1st president, Griffie-Clerck and Prosecution
 Court of Assizes
 Court of Appeal of Brussels: 1st president, Griffie-Clerck and Prosecution
 Tribunal of First Instance of Brussels

Libraries
 Library of the Magistrate
 Library of the Bar Association of Brussels
 Library of the Lawyers

Arrondissement of Brussels
Moreover, the Palace of Justice is the seat of the judicial arrondissement of Brussels (covering the entire Brussels-Capital Region), having split from the Flemish part of the former bilingual arrondissement of Brussels-Halle-Vilvoorde (BHV) in mid-2012 (which made Halle-Vilvoorde a monolingual Flemish electoral and judicial district).

Bar Association of Brussels
Finally, the Palace of Justice is also home to the Bar Association of Brussels, a professional order of 7,000 Brussels lawyers, founded on 14 December 1810. Since 1984, the Bar Association of Brussels has been split into two, the French-speaking order and the Dutch-speaking order.

Surroundings
The initial development project, which provided for a large square in a semicircle (1862), could not be implemented due to Poelaert's sudden death. Consequently, this square does not have an architectural unity in the buildings that surrounds it, nor the belvedere coming from the original plan, and instead constitutes a vast transit space unsuitable for pedestrians, not functioning as an urban square but as a roundabout for cars preventing the appropriation of the place by walkers. In 1905, it was the scene of prestigious commemorations for the 75th anniversary of Belgian Independence. Nowadays, it offers one of Brussels' finest views. From the elevated vantage point, the famous tower of Brussels' Town Hall on the Grand-Place/Grote Markt is clearly visible. On a sunny day, the Koekelberg Basilica and even the Atomium can be seen.

Next to the Palace of Justice, on the Place Poelaert, stand two war memorials: the Belgian Infantry Memorial by Edouard Vereycken (1935) and the Anglo-Belgian Memorial by Charles Sargeant Jagger (1923). In addition, the Poelaert Elevators, in popular language the Elevators of the Marolles, are a set of two public elevators that connects the upper and lower town between the Place Poelaert and the /. They were executed by the AVA Architects office, under the coordination of the architect Patrice Neirinck, and were inaugurated in June 2002.

Influence

There is a well-known story that Adolf Hitler was reportedly fond of the building. Albert Speer, the Minister of Armaments and War Production in Nazi Germany, stated in his book Inside the Third Reich that he had been dispatched to Brussels in 1940 to study the building.

Although lacking the dome and being much smaller, the Palace of Justice in Lima, Peru; which houses the Supreme Court of Peru, is based upon Brussels' Palace of Justice.

In popular culture

Books
 The Palace of Justice is represented in the album The Last Pharaoh, published in 2019, from the comic strip series Blake and Mortimer, in which it plays a central place of the plot.

See also
 Neoclassical architecture in Belgium
 History of Brussels
 Belgium in "the long nineteenth century"
 List of tallest structures built before the 20th century

References

Footnotes

Notes

Bibliography

External links

 Climbing the Law Courts 
  Justitiepaleis or  Palais de justice

Palaces in Brussels
Libraries in Belgium
City of Brussels
Protected heritage sites in Brussels
Law of Belgium
Brussels
Government buildings completed in 1883
Terminating vistas